The 1885 Dissolution Honours List was issued in June 1885 prior to the general election of that year.

The recipients of honours are displayed as they were styled before their new honour.

Marquess
Gavin Campbell, Earl of Breadalbane,  by the names, styles, and titles of Marquess of Breadalbane, of Kenmure in the County of Perth

Earl and Viscount
The Right Honourable Sir Stafford Henry Northcote   by the names, styles, and titles of Viscount Saint Gyres, of Newton Saint Gyres, in the county of Devon, and Earl of Iddesleigh, in the said county

Earl
Alexander Duff, Earl of Fife (previously an Earl in the Peerage of Scotland)

Baron
Mervyn Edward, Viscount Powerscourt  in that part of the United Kingdom called Ireland,  by the name, style, and title of Baron Powerscourt, of Powerscourt, in the county of Wicklow
Anthony Henley, Baron Henley, in that part of the United Kingdom called Ireland, by the name, style, and title of Baron Northington, of Watford, in the county of Northampton
Sir Nathaniel Mayer Rothschild  by the name, style, and title of Baron Rothschild, of Tring, in the county of Hertford
Edward Charles Baring, by the name, style, and title of Baron Revelstoke, of Membland, in the county of Devon
The Right Honourable Sir Robert Porrett Collier  a Member of the Judicial Committee of the Privy Council, by the name, style, and title of Baron Monkswell, of Monkswell, in the county of Devon
The Right Honourable Sir Arthur Hobhouse  a Member of the Judicial Committee of the Privy Council, by the name, style, and title of Baron Hobhouse, of Hadspen, in the county of Somerset
Sir Ralph Robert Wheeler Lingen  by the name, style, and title of Baron Lingen, of Lingen, in the county of Hereford
The Right Honourable Edward Gibson, Chancellor of that part of the United Kingdom called Ireland, by the name, style, and title of Baron Ashbourne, of Ashbourne, in the county of Meath
Rowland Winn, by the name, style, and title of Baron Saint Oswald, of Nostell, in the West Riding of the county of York

Baronets
John Millais 
Charles Tennant  
George Frederic Watts  (declined honour)

Knight Bachelor
Henry Edwards

The Most Noble Order of the Garter

Knight of the Most Noble Order of the Garter (KG)
William Compton, Marquess of Northampton
William Molyneux, Earl of Sefton

The Most Honourable Order of the Bath

Knight Commander of the Order of the Bath (KCB)
Civil Division
Augustus Keppel Stephenson  Solicitor to the Treasury

References

1885 in the United Kingdom
Dissolution Honours
1885 awards